Jennie Pond Atwater (1865-96) was the daughter of Congregationalist Rev. Chauncey Northrop Pond. She was born in Oberlin, Ohio, September 14, 1865. She served for four years a missionary with her husband, the Rev. Ernest R. Atwater, at the Fenzhou station (China) of the American Board of Foreign Missions. She died in China of puerperal fever on November 25, 1896. She was 31. Her husband and all of her children - Ernestine (b. 1889), Mary (b. 1892), Celia, and Bertha (b. 1896) were killed in the Boxer Rebellion.

Sources
 Our Jennie: Jennie Pond Atwater, by Rev. Chauncey Northrop Pond, Memorial pamphlet published in 1896.

1865 births
1896 deaths
People from Oberlin, Ohio
American Congregationalist missionaries
Congregationalist missionaries in China
American expatriates in China

Deaths_in_childbirth